Vienna is an unincorporated community and census-designated place (CDP) located within Independence Township in Warren County, New Jersey, United States, that was created as part of the 2010 United States Census. As of the 2010 Census, the CDP's population was 981. 

Through the 2000 United States Census, the CDP was combined as part of Great Meadows-Vienna. Effective with the 2010 Census, the CDP was split into its two components, Great Meadows (with a 2010 Census population of 303) and Vienna. As of the 2000 United States Census, the population of the combined Great Meadows-Vienna CDP was 1,264.

History
The settlement was first called "Cumminstown", named for the Cummins family, early settlers who had purchased land in the area in 1755 and remained in the area until 1880.

Around 1828, the settlement's name was changed to Vienna after the city in Austria, the home country of the Cummins family. A Christian church was organized in Vienna in 1839.

By 1882, the population had grown to 450, at which time Vienna had a post office, hotel, chair factory, foundry, and a "large local trade".

Geography
According to the United States Census Bureau, the CDP had a total area of 2.933 square miles (7.598 km2), including 2.922 square miles (7.569 km2) of land and 0.011 square miles (0.029 km2) of water (0.38%).

Demographics

Census 2010

References

Census-designated places in Warren County, New Jersey
Independence Township, New Jersey